= Jnanadhir Chandra Sarma Sarkar =

Judge of the Calcutta High Court

Justice Janadhir Chandra Sharma Sarkar

Personal details
- Occupation: Jurist

Jnanadhir Chandra Sarma Sarkar was an Indian jurist. He served as a judge of the Calcutta High Court.

== Sarma Sarkar Commission ==
The Sarma Sarkar commission headed by Justice (Retired) Janadhir Sharma Sarkar was formed in 1970 by the Government oF West Bengal for inquiring into charges of public servants trampling on democratic rights of citizens.

== Works ==
Commission of Inquiry : Practise and Principles
